István Tatár (24 March 1958 – 2 January 2017 in Eger) was a Hungarian sprinter.  He competed in the 4 × 100 metres relay and the 100 meters at the 1980 and 1988 Summer Olympics.

References

1958 births
2017 deaths
Hungarian male sprinters
Athletes (track and field) at the 1980 Summer Olympics
Athletes (track and field) at the 1988 Summer Olympics
Olympic athletes of Hungary
Sportspeople from Eger